Huvudsta metro station is a station on the blue line of the Stockholm metro, located in Huvudsta, Solna Municipality. The station was opened on 18 August 1985 as part of the extension between Västra skogen and Rinkeby.

Gallery

References

Blue line (Stockholm metro) stations
Railway stations opened in 1985
1985 establishments in Sweden

pt:Huvudsta